Phyrdenus is a genus of hidden snout weevils in the beetle family Curculionidae. There are more than 20 described species in Phyrdenus.

Species
These 23 species belong to the genus Phyrdenus:

 Phyrdenus angusticollis Fiedler, 1952
 Phyrdenus boliviensis Hustache, 1924
 Phyrdenus bruchoides Fiedler, 1941
 Phyrdenus bulbifer Fiedler, 1952
 Phyrdenus bullatus Casey, 1892
 Phyrdenus carinicollis Fiedler, 1943
 Phyrdenus caseyi Faust, 1896
 Phyrdenus conotracheloides Blatchley, 1922
 Phyrdenus cryptacruroides Fiedler, 1941
 Phyrdenus divergens (Germar, 1824)
 Phyrdenus diversus Faust, 1896
 Phyrdenus frater Fiedler, 1952
 Phyrdenus griseofasciatus Fiedler, 1943
 Phyrdenus griseus Fiedler, 1952
 Phyrdenus muriceus (Germar, 1824)
 Phyrdenus nigrosparsus Fiedler, 1952
 Phyrdenus pallidisignatus Voss, 1939
 Phyrdenus pallidus Fiedler, 1943
 Phyrdenus rufosquamosus Fiedler, 1943
 Phyrdenus setifer Champion, 1905
 Phyrdenus tincticollis Champion, 1905
 Phyrdenus tuberiferus Fiedler, 1943
 Phyrdenus undatus Leconte, 1876

References

Further reading

External links

 

Cryptorhynchinae
Articles created by Qbugbot